Norwegian National Road 191 runs down Groruddalen in Oslo from north to south. The road runs between Trosterud in Alna and Veitvet in Grorud. The road (excluding junction) is 1.7 km.

The road consists of Tvetenveien and Nedre Kalbakkvei. The road is currently two-laned, but Nedre Kalbakkvei up to Alfaset is often used as a four-laned road. This is because heavy transport often use the terminal in Alna, at Alna Station.

References

191
Streets in Oslo